The Georgia Nonpublic Postsecondary Education Commission (GNPEC) has statutory responsibilities in matters relating to nonpublic, postsecondary, educational institutions as per O.C.G.A. § 20-3-250 “Nonpublic Postsecondary Educational Institutions Act of 1990.”

Overview
The mission of the GNPEC "is to ensure that each authorized nonpublic postsecondary educational institution in 
Georgia is satisfying its commitments to hardworking Georgians through sound academics and financial stability".
All in-state nonpublic and out-of-state postsecondary education institutions that want to operate in the State of Georgia must receive authorization from the GNPEC and renew that authorization in subsequent years. Any business in Georgia that wants to include "university" or "college" in its name is required to obtain permission from GNPEC.

The GNPEC has three primary functions:
1. Authorize and regulate the operations of private postsecondary colleges and schools in Georgia. Public schools including the University System of Georgia and the Technical College System of Georgia are public.
2. Review complaints filed by students attending such schools. During FY22, 46 complaints were investigated and responded to.
3. Process requests for transcripts of students who attended such schools that have closed. During FY22, 788 transcript requests were processed.
Additionally, GNPEC is the coordinating “portal” agency for the National Council for State Authorization Reciprocity Agreements (NC-SARA).

GNPEC Authorization does not require accreditation unless the institution offers degree programs. Accreditation is the responsibility of other agencies although both may review some common elements. Some of the areas that the commission evaluates include consumer protection, institutional policies and administration, data management, and the issuance and revocation of authorization to operate in Georgia.

Reciprocity
In October 2015 Georgia became a member of the National Council for State Authorization Reciprocity Agreements (NC-SARA). GA-SARA belongs to a national interstate compact that allows public/private colleges/universities the ability to offer online programming to students across the country without incurring additional authorization fees in other states.

GNPEC is the coordinating agency for out-of-state institutions that provide online programming to Georgia residents. If an institution is SARA-authorized in another state, it is not required to apply for authorization from GNPEC. Conversely, GNPEC reviews applications from Georgia institutions wanting to become SARA-approved so that they may offer online education to residents in other states.

Exemptions
The commission, in its sole discretion, may exempt the following non-degree granting institutions PK to grade 12 entities; bona fide trade, business, professional, or fraternal organizations; recreational or avocational education; institutions established, operated, governed or licensed by the state of Georgia; any flight school holding a federal air agency certificate issued by the Federal Aviation Administration, nonpublic and nonprofit entities with programs of study in theology, divinity, religious education and ministerial training; nonpublic law school accredited by the American Bar Association; nonpublic postsecondary educational institutions on campuses located on military installations or bases; a school limited to preparation for a specific occupational examination recognized by a government agency or bona fide trade, business, or fraternal organization and where the student is already eligible to sit for the examination; a nonpublic, nonprofit accredited entity operating 10+ years or chartered prior to 1955; an entity offering only education or training in income tax theory or income tax return preparation when the total contract price does not exceed $1000; or a nonpublic, accredited medical or dental entity.

Commission members
The commission has eleven members, each serving a three-year term. They may not serve more than two full consecutive terms. Each member shall be appointed by the governor and confirmed by the Georgia Senate. The members serve without compensation but receive the same per diem and are reimbursed for travel or mileage as is authorized for General Assembly members. 
  
At least one member shall represent degree-granting nonpublic postsecondary educational institutions; at least one member shall  represent nonpublic postsecondary educational institutions which grant certificates only; and at least one member shall represent exempt education and postsecondary educational institutions. According to the statute, "The remaining members shall not be employed by or otherwise represent or have an interest in any nonpublic postsecondary educational institution."

The commission meets at least quarterly, but they met five times during 2022. Meetings include review of the budget, reports from staff, a briefing on legislation affecting the commission, adverse actions taken by the commission, updates on the  Tuition Guaranty Trust Fund, proposed policy and/or rules changes, updates to minimum standards, relationships with public postsecondary education institutions, agency initiatives and commission actions as per Georgia law.

Administration
The executive director is in charge of operations with a staff of 15. Nine staff members are full-time employees; six are contract workers. The agency had a FY22 operating budget of $949,495. Revenue collections for FY22 were $1,144,524.
During fiscal year 2022 and following the COVID-19 pandemic, all agency staff were permanently assigned to work remotely. At the time, GNPEC was the only Georgia agency to do this.

Standards
The commission reviews each applicant based on a set of 14 standards. These are: program integrity, facilities & equipment, faculty & staff, catalog & enrollment agreement, credentials, student records, institutional & business entity compliance, financial viability, advertising, owner & employee character, housing, refund policy, cancellation policy and complaint policy.

Application
The initial application for authorization to operate must be submitted using the forms provided by the commission and include a catalog or written description published, or proposed to be published, by the institution. The institution must not operate in any other building unless authorization is obtained for that branch facility. Following application review, an inspection of the physical facility may be deemed necessary.

Finances
Portions of O.C.G.A. §§ 20-3-250.6 require that authorized and exempt institutions must be judged financially sound. A rigorous 
financial viability assessment (FVA) was established in April 2015. Authorized and “audit only” exempt institutions have an annual FVA to determine fiscal stability. For NC-SARA and GA-SARA applications, a United States Department of Education Financial 
Responsibility Composite Score is required. Non-Title IV institutions and those with scores between 1.00 and 1.5 are subject to an FVA. In FY22, FVAs were conducted for 347 authorized institutions, 36 audit/bond exempt institutions and (1) GA-SARA institution. The assessment determines whether LOW, MODERATE or HIGH financial monitoring is required. These reviews and communication with the institution help the GNPEC prepare for potential teach-outs and student reimbursements in the event of institutional closure.

Bonds
Part of the application process involves a financial assessment of the institution. If the findings raise concern, the commission may require a surety bond conditioned upon the faithful performance of the applicant conforming to rules, regulations, and policies of the commission.

Collection of fees
Fees are collected by the commission for the following activities: initial application, authorization renewal, special fees for institutional evaluation, yearly Tuition Guarantee Trust Fund, and special fees to offset other identified administrative costs.

Records transfer
The “Postsecondary Educational Authorization Act of 1978” provided that All records, files, accounts, and related items resulting from the “Georgia Proprietary School Act” be transferred to the GNPEC from the Georgia State Board of Education. This has been an on-going process, and during FY22 a contract file clerk worked full-time digitizing 492 boxes of hard-copy student records. Approximately 1,300 boxes remain to be processed.

Trust fund
The Tuition Guaranty Trust Fund (TGTF) is a reserve fund authorized by O.C.G.A. §§ 20-3-250.27 to provide a teach-out or refund to students at institutions that close and fail to meet their obligations to students. It is funded by a yearly fee of 1/10 of 1% of gross tuition and is paid by the institutions authorized by GNPEC. The institutional contribution to the fund for FY22 was $234,312.  At the end of FY22 the fund balance was $4,467,187. Four GNPEC commission members and the executive director act as fund trustees.

Enforcement
When an institution deemed to be subject to GNPEC regulations fails to comply with those regulations, adverse actions begin. 
The initial action is a Cease and desist warning email followed by a cease-and-desist demand email. Eight of these emails were issued in FY22.

If the subject institution fails to respond appropriately, a cease-and-desist letter is sent certified mail, followed by Formal Closure, Notification of Noncompliance, and Student Record Demand letters  sent certified mail in accordance with O.C.G.A. § 20-3-250.17. Seven cease-and-desist letters and one demand letter were sent in FY22.

If the subject institution still fails to respond appropriately, the GNPEC will request action from the Attorney General of Georgia. The AG was contacted regarding four institutions in FY22 and the AG took legal action against one institution.

References

External links
Georgia Nonpublic Postsecondary Education Commission website
GNPEC 2022 Annual Report

Education
1990 establishments in Georgia (U.S. state)
Education in Georgia (U.S. state)